Wild Cattle (Portuguese: Gado Bravo) is a 1934 Portuguese romantic comedy film directed by António Lopes Ribeiro and Max Nosseck and starring Nita Brandao, Olly Gebauer and Mariana Alves.

A number of those employed on the film were exiles from Nazi Germany. The film's sets were designed by the art director Herbert Lippschitz.

Cast
 Nita Brandao as Branca  
 Olly Gebauer as Nina  
 Mariana Alves as Mariana  
 Raul de Carvalho as Manuel Garrido  
 Arthur Duarte as Arthur Fernandes  
 Sig Arno as Jackson  
 Alberto Reis as Pascoal  
 Armando Machado as Joaquim  
 José Santos as Taberneiro  
 Falcau
 Baltasar de Azevedo 
 António Silva

References

Bibliography 
 Vieira, Patricia. Portuguese Film, 1930-1960,: The Staging of the New State Regime. A&C Black, 2013.

External links 
 

1934 films
1930s Portuguese-language films
Films directed by António Lopes Ribeiro
Films directed by Max Nosseck
Portuguese black-and-white films
Portuguese romantic comedy films
1934 romantic comedy films